Poddy may refer to:

 George Aiston (1879–1943), Australian ethnographer and outback pioneer
 Bert Davie (1899-1979), Australian cricketer and Australian rules footballer
 Arthur Hiskins (1886–1971), Australian rules footballer
 Podkayne "Poddy" Fries, title character of the science fiction novel Podkayne of Mars by Robert A. Heinlein
 Poddy, an orphan calf in British English

Lists of people by nickname